Ragan Dasht (also known as Lagan Dasht) is a village in Mazkureh Rural District, in the Central District of Sari County, Mazandaran Province, Iran. At the 2006 census, its population was 500, in 126 families.

References 

Populated places in Sari County